Ram Racing is a British endurance racing team based in Northamptonshire, England. The team was founded in 2012, whose motorsport background includes working as lead mechanic for Michael Schumacher during his time with Mercedes. Funding for the venture was provided by an anonymous backer located in the Middle East, later revealed to be Cheerag Arya, and the team is located in a 1,200 square meter facility on the edge of Silverstone Circuit.

History

2013 
Ram's debut was in  the 2013 European Le Mans Series, with two Ferrari 458 Italias fielded in the GTE class. The No. 52 car took victory at Imola, the Red Bull Ring, Circuit Paul Ricard, and second place at Silverstone and the Hungaroring. At the end of the season, the No. 52 and No. 53 cars had earned 114 and 63 points respectively.

2014 

2014 opened with an 11th-place finish by a Ferrari 458 Italia GT3 at the Dubai 24 Hour. Ram Racing's effort in the 2014 FIA World Endurance Championship season was brief, with their Ferrari 458 Italia GT2s starting only at the 6 Hours of Silverstone and 24 Hours of Le Mans. The No. 52 car earned 8 points with one sixth-place finish and a retirement, and the No. 53 car earned 26 points with fifth and sixth-place finishes. The team announced an official withdrawal from the championship on 11 June, with only a skeleton crew remaining in employment. A six-month hiatus from racing was ended by an announcement in late December that a Mercedes-Benz SLS AMG GT3 would be fielded at the 2015 24H Dubai. The goal of the switch to Mercedes-Benz was to reduce cost and gain a foothold for budgeting. On 9 December, the FIA granted the six-round 24H Series championship status.

2015
Ram Racing began the 2015 season with an announcement of a full foray into the 24H Series, continuing to field the Mercedes-Benz SLS AMG GT3. The opening race in Dubai resulted in a second-place finish 4 laps behind the Black Falcon Mercedes-Benz. This ended a six-month drought started by the team's financial trouble during the 2014 WEC. On 11 March, the team entered the 2015 British GT Championship with the Mercedes-Benz SLS AMG GT3, driven by Lewis Plato and Alistair MacKinnon. During round 2 of the 24H Series, the No. 30 car finished in second place at 12H Italy-Mugello after delays in the pits and multiple Code 60 periods.

References

British auto racing teams
24 Hours of Le Mans teams
British GT Championship teams
Blancpain Endurance Series teams
FIA World Endurance Championship teams
European Le Mans Series teams
Auto racing teams established in 2012